Lauretta Vinciarelli (1943 – August 3, 2011) was an artist, architect, and professor of architecture at the collegiate level.

Background and education 
Born in Arbe, Italy, Lauretta Vinciarelli was the daughter of Alberto and Annunciata Cencioni Vinciarelli. The family moved to Rome where she grew up, and her father was an organist in the St. Peter's Basilica in Vatican, and her mother was a teacher. Vinciarelli studied architecture at Sapienza University of Rome, and was accepted to the Ordine degli Architetti di Roma e del Lazio (the Italian Board of Architects). She practiced architecture in Rome before emigrating to the U.S. in 1968. In 1993, she married Peter Rowe, a distinguished professor of architecture at Harvard University.

Career

Education 
After moving to the U.S., Vinciarelli taught architecture design studio for many years in many schools, including Rice University in Houston, Texas, University of Illinois, Pratt Institute, Brooklyn, Columbia University, City College, and The Open Atelier of Design and Architecture (OADA), a non-accredited design school founded by Giuseppe Zambonini in New York City.

Architecture 
During the 1980s, Vinciarelli worked with Minimalist artist Donald Judd in New York City and in the American Southwest, especially in Marfa, Texas. Marfa quickly became a research site for theoretical postmodern architectural proposals such as Marfa II Project, Marfa, 1978 and Untitled Drawings 1981. Vinciarelli used a rigorously inductive methodology to define and integrate fundamental architecture and design components. On the topic of the Marfa "hangar and courthouse" study, Vinciarelli stated her aim was "to form a fabric." In 1984, Vinciarelli and Judd entered the winning entry for the Kennedy Square Providence, Rhode Island, competition. Their project drew upon Vinciarelli's earlier work, including her landscape architecture proposal of 1977 for a system of urban gardens, commissioned by the Regional Administration of Apulia, in southern Italy. In 1986, Vinciarelli was awarded an Artists Fellowship in Architecture by the New York Foundation for the Arts.

Art 
From the early 1980s until the end of her life, Vinciarelli created evanescent watercolor-and-ink studies of hypothetical architectural spaces. Her work has been analyzed by scholars and critics, including Ada Louise Huxtable and K. Michael Hays in Not Architecture But Evidence That It Exists. Vinciarelli belonged to an esteemed and influential group of contemporary paper architects, which included, among others, Raimund Abraham, John Hejduk, Gaetano Pesce, Lebbeus Woods, and Aldo Rossi. Vinciarelli created powerful and inspiring, hand-crafted imagery of topological space, on paper, which is a distillation of traditional, historical, and imaginal references. Her use of water elements extend the essence of architecture through transparency and reflection.

About her artwork, Vinciarelli said, "The architectural space I have painted since 1987 does not portray solutions to specific demands of use, it is not the space of a project; at least not a project as the rational answer to a program."

Collections 
Vinciarelli's art is part of many private collections and cultural institutions, including the International Archive of Women in Architecture (IAWA) at Virginia Polytechnic Institute and State University, the National Gallery of Art, Washington, D.C., the San Francisco Museum of Modern Art, California, Columbia University's Avery Architectural & Fine Arts Library, Art Institute of Chicago. A large body of work by Vinciarelli, including the luminous Orange Sound series is held at the Museum of Modern Art in New York. A 2015 exhibition at MAXXI, the National Museum for the Twentieth Century Arts in Rome, dedicated to architecture included a group of Vinciarelli's abstract watercolors donated by the artist’s family.

Museum and archive collections 
Lauretta Vinciarelli's work is part of major international collections.
 A.A.M. Architettura Arte Moderna
 Senza titolo
 medium/ media: 3 tecnica mista su cartoncino
 dimensions: each 44, 5 x 57 cm., 1975
 Hangar + Courtyard,
 medium. media: 3 inchiostro e tempera su carta lucida
 dinemsions: each 39, 5 x 64 cm. 1980; 1980
 Classification: architectural drawing
 Collezione Francesco Moschini e Gabriel Vaduva, 2002
 San Francisco Museum of Modern Art, San Francisco, CA
 Atrium in Red, 1992
 Medium/media: watercolor and ink on paper
 Dimensions: 30 in. x 22 3/8 in. (76.2 cm x 56.83 cm)
 Classification: architectural drawing
 Collection: SFMOMA Accessions Committee Fund, 1977
 Night #6, 1996
 Medium/media: watercolor and ink on paper
 Dimensions: 30 in. x 22 5/8 in. (76.2 cm x 57.47 cm)
 Classification: architectural drawing
 Collection SFMOMA: Accessions Committee Fund: gift of Frances and John Bowes, Emily L. Carroll and Thomas W. Weisel, Doris and Donald Fisher, Maria Monet Markowitz and Jerome Markowitz, Madeleine H. Russell, and the Modern Art Council, 1997
 Carnegie Museum of Art, Pittsburgh, PA
 Garden Structure; Untitled,[perspective], 1986
 Medium watercolor on heavy paper
 Measurements H: 13 1/2 x W: 16 3/4 in. (34.29 x 42.55 cm)
 Collection: The Heinz Architectural Center, gift of the Drue Heinz Trust
 National Gallery of Art, Washington, DC
 Long Horizon II [center]. Dimensions: 74 x 102.7 cm (29 1/8 x 40 7/16 in.), 1995;
Long Horizon II [left]. Dimensions: 74 x 104 cm (29 1/8 x 40 15/16 in.), 1995;
Long Horizon II [right]. Dimensions: 74 x 104 cm (29 1/8 x 40 15/16 in.), 1995
 Medium: watercolor and pastel over graphite on heavy woven paper
 Gift of Mr. and Mrs. Roger Ferris, Rowland and Eleanor Miller, and Eric and Ellen Somberg, 1998
 Accn. N° 1998.26.2; Accn. N° 1998.26.2; N° 1998.26.3
 Museum of Modern Art, New York, NY
 Orange Sound, project, 7 watercolor series, 1999
 Medium: graphite, and color ink on paper
 Dimensions: each 30 x 22" (76.2 x 55.9 cm)
 Gift of Mrs. Gianluigi Gabetti Purchase Fund
 Annc. N° 1417.2000.1, Annc. N° 1417.2000.2, Annc. N° 1417.2000.3, Annc. N° 1417.2000.4, Annc. N° 1417.2000.5, Annc. N° 1417.2000.6 1417.2000.7
 e-card
 International Archive of Women in Architecture (IAWA)
 Lauretta Vinciarelli Art Work
 11 untitled tempera drawings on boards
 IAWA Small Collections; Special Collections 1907-2013
 Virginia Polytechnic Institute and State University.

Exhibitions 
The work of Lauretta Vinciarelli has been published and exhibited in solo and group shows at galleries and museums around the world.

Solo shows 
 1978: Lauretta Vinciarelli: Projects 1973–78. Institute for Architecture and Urban Studies; Wave Hill, New York, N.Y.
 1980: Lauretta Vinciarelli: Processo Metafora. Progetti e disegni, 1974-1980. A.A.M. Architettura Arte Moderna, Rome, Italy.
 1981: Lauretta Vinciarelli: Projects 1980–81. Young Hoffman Gallery, Chicago, Illinois.
 1982: Lauretta Vinciarelli: Projects. Princeton University Graduate School of Design, Princeton, New Jersey
 1992: Lauretta Vinciarelli: Red Room, Water Enclosures, and Other Unfolding Spaces. GSAPP, Columbia University, N.Y.
 1992: Lauretta Vinciarelli: Rotte Raume. Museum fur angewandte Kunst, Vienna, Austria
 1996: Spatial Reverberations: Watercolors by Lauretta Vinciarelli. National Building Museum, Washington
 1997: Reflections: Watercolors by Lauretta Vinciarelli. Gund Hall Gallery, Harvard Graduate School of Design
 1999: Incandescence: Watercolors by Lauretta Vinciarelli. San Francisco Museum of Modern Art, CA
 2002: Lauretta Vinciarelli: Intimate Distance. Henry Urbach Architecture, New York City
 2012: Clear Light: The Architecture of Lauretta Vinciarelli. City College of New York, N.Y.

Group shows 
 1975: Goodbye Five: Work by Young Architects. Institute for Architecture and Urban Studies, New York, N.Y.
 1975: Architectural Studies and Projects. Museum of Modern Art, New York, N.Y.
 1977: Drawing for A More Modern Architecture. The Drawing Center, New York, N.Y.
 1977: Women in American Architecture: A Historic and Contemporary Perspective. Brooklyn Museum, N.Y. and Hayden Gallery, :::MIT.
 1978: Architectural Drawings. Otis Art Institute, Los Angeles, CA.
 1979: Elements of Architecture. Sperone Westwater Fisher Gallery, New York, N.Y.
 1980: Art by Architects. Rosa Esman Gallery, 70 Greene Street, New York, N.Y.
 1980: Creation and Recreation: America Draws, Jugend Hall, Museum of Finnish Architecture, Helsinki, Finland
 1980: Desire As Archetype: The Chicago Tribune Tower Competition/ Late Entries.
 1980: Young Architects: an Exhibition at Yale School of Architecture. Gallery of Art and Architecture, New Haven, CT.
 1985: Project for Palmanova. Venice Biennale of Architecture: 3rd International Exhibition of Architecture
 1991: Contemporary Architectural Drawings. Miriam & Ira D. Wallach Art Gallery and Arthur Ross Gallery at Columbia University, NY
 1997: Summer Group Show. Max Protetch Gallery, New York, N.Y.
 2001: Inside Out: New Perspectives on the Heinz Architectural Center’s Collection. The Heinz Architectural Center Carnegie Museum of Art, Pittsburgh, PA.
 2002: Luminous Void Volume of Light, series (2001). Whitney Biennial, Whitney Museum of American Art, New York City.
 2002: Italian Architecture Signs Since The War. Dalla Collezione Francesco Moschini, A.A.M. Architettura Arte Moderna, Florence, Italy.
 2003: Visions and Utopias: Architectural Drawings from the Museum of Modern Art. New York, NY; Museum of Finnish Architecture, Helsinki, Finland
 2004: Watercolor Worlds: Lauretta Vinciarelli, et al. Dorsky Gallery, New York
 2004: Envisioning Architecture: Drawings from the Museum of Modern Art, New York. National Building Museum, Washington, D.C.

References
External links

 Agrest, Diana, Patricia Conway, and Leslie Weisman, eds. The Sex of Architecture. New York: Harry N. Abrams, 1996.
 Judd Foundation. “Lauretta Vinciarelli.” Accessed October 24, 2021. https://juddfoundation.org/programs/lauretta-vinciarelli/.
 Siefert, Rebecca. “Lauretta Vinciarelli and Historical Types as Generative Device.” Cite: The Architecture and Design Review of Houston, no. 102 (January 1, 2021): 60–67.

1943 births
2011 deaths
Architects from Rome
Italian women architects
American women architects
Architecture educators
20th-century American architects
Italian emigrants to the United States
20th-century Italian painters
21st-century Italian painters
20th-century Italian women artists
21st-century Italian women artists
Italian contemporary artists
20th-century American women artists
21st-century American women artists